Talk About Body is the debut album from Brooklyn electropop band MEN. It was released on February 1, 2011 on IAMSOUND Records in the US, and Sony/Columbia in Europe. It received a favorable average score of 64 on Metacritic. 
The song lyrics contain a diverse range of social and political messages. In her interview with MEN for L.A. Music Blog, Kristyn Scorsone described the album as "a dance revolution that is lyrically provocative. Both smart and political, the album talks about not only body, but gay baby makin’, government profiteering in regards to war, feminism, gender politics, and simply how it feels to be getting too old for the club scene."

Track listing

Quotes
Album Review
The Guardian - "MEN's debut is one of the best of the year. Or, at least, the best of the niche area where gender politics and dance music intersect. "

VideosOff Our Backs - November 4, 2010, director: Bryce Kass Who Am I To Feel So Free'' - February 14, 2011

References

2011 debut albums
MEN (band) albums
Iamsound Records albums